is an arcade sub-series of Nintendo's Mario Kart series, developed and published by Namco and later Bandai Namco Games under license from Nintendo. In all installments, for an additional fee, a player's data can be saved on a magnetic card which can be inserted into the machine again later to retain unlocked items and records. Nintendo had a limited role in development, mainly for quality control purposes. It has a camera to photograph the player's face. The photo can be customized and displayed above the player's character during multiplayer races.

The initial game, Mario Kart Arcade GP, is the first Mario Kart to feature playable crossover characters: Namco's Pac-Man, Ms. Pac-Man, and Blinky, which all are from the Pac-Man games. Its sequel features Mametchi, a character from the Tamagotchi games, and the third installment includes Don from the Taiko no Tatsujin franchise.

Installments

The Mario Kart Arcade GP sub-series started in 2005 with the release of Mario Kart Arcade GP. The game has been followed by three sequels: Mario Kart Arcade GP 2 (2007), Mario Kart Arcade GP DX (2013), and Mario Kart Arcade GP VR (2017).

Mario Kart Arcade GP

Mario Kart Arcade GP is the initial installment in the series. Originally designed for the Triforce arcade board (also used for F-Zero AX) by Namco, players can race as one of eleven characters on twenty-four tracks.

There are a total of six cups, with four tracks in each, totalling twenty-four. The cups are Mario Cup, Wario Cup, Pac-Man Cup, DK Cup, Bowser Cup, and the unlockable Rainbow Cup. After a track is completed, the player must insert additional credits to continue the game, even if first place is achieved. After finishing all four races from each stage, a "challenge game" comes up, in which the player is required to complete a certain task; each of them requires the player to drive to a goal under a certain amount of time while under a certain condition, such as driving backwards through a field of banana peels.

When a player hits one of the item boxes scattered throughout the tracks, the player is given one of the three selected items chosen at the start of a race. Mario Kart Arcade GP features items new and old. Unique to this game is a lock-on feature for the items.

Also unique to this game is a temporary shield that is produced while powersliding which protects players from items thrown at them by the other racers.

The game has eleven characters, which are all eight playable characters from Mario Kart 64, and guest characters Pac-Man, Ms. Pac-Man, and Blinky. Most of the sound effects came from Mario Kart: Double Dash including the pre-race countdown timer to commence racing.

Mario Kart Arcade GP 2

Mario Kart Arcade GP 2 is the second game in the Mario Kart Arcade GP arcade game series released in 2007. The game was the first in the series to be developed and published by Bandai Namco Games. The game used the Triforce arcade system board, which was used in the previous arcade installment.

The game features the "Nam Cam" camera features of its predecessor, 50cc, 100cc, and 150cc difficulty modes, and new items. During the races, there is color commentary, which can be toggled on or off at any time prior to starting the race. In the Japanese version, this is done by the prominent Japanese voice actor and on-screen personality Kōichi Yamadera. In the English version, this is done by Justin Berti. All eleven characters from Mario Kart Arcade GP return, alongside new characters Waluigi from the Mario series and Mametchi from the Tamagotchi series. All cups from the first game also appear, with the addition of two new cups, Yoshi Cup and Waluigi Cup.

Mario Kart Arcade GP DX

Mario Kart Arcade GP DX is the third Mario Kart Arcade GP game, which was released in Japanese arcades on July 25, 2013, and in North American and European arcades in 2014 (previously announced for end of 2013), but the game was available in all Dave & Buster's restaurants from February 16, 2014 until April 2014.

The game has ten redesigned courses, and features introduced in Mario Kart 7 such as gliders and underwater racing. Along with Grand Prix and Battle mode, two new modes are Alter-Ego and Team. Alter-Ego mode uses online functionality to allow players to race against ghosts records previously set by other players. Team mode allows two players to face against two computer-controlled opponents. The two players can combine their karts to form a more powerful kart, with one player driving and the other serving as the gunner, similar to Mario Kart Double Dash!!. Only ten of the thirteen characters from the previous installment return in this game, along with Bowser Jr. and Don-Chan from Taiko no Tatsujin. Six characters and ten palette swaps were added to this game through online updates.

The racing commentary is voiced in Japanese by Rica Matsumoto, who also voices Ash Ketchum in the Japanese version of the Pokémon anime, and in English by Jack Merluzzi, who is the in-game announcer in Fast Racing Neo.

Mario Kart Arcade GP VR

Mario Kart Arcade GP VR is the fourth Mario Kart Arcade GP game, which was released in Japanese arcades on July 14, 2017. Unlike the previous games, it was only released in VR Zone arcades in Japan, Korea, the UK, the Philippines, the US, and France. Unlike prior Mario Kart games, it is played with a virtual reality headset and in first person. It was developed on a HTC Vive Microsoft Windows arcade system. Similar to the prior Mario Kart arcade games, it is controlled via a steering wheel and acceleration and brake pedals. The game includes only four playable characters, all of which appeared from the previous games: Mario, Luigi, Princess Peach and Yoshi. Items are thrown by making hand movements, which the game registers by an attachment to the player's wrist. For example, the player throws a Green Shell with a throwing motion with the open palm. Instead of Item Boxes, the game uses red, yellow, and green balloons to store items. Gliders are used similarly to Mario Kart Arcade GP DX.

Characters
Each new game hosts a new selection of characters and often guest characters from featured franchises.

See also
Pac-Man World Rally
Ridge Racer

Notes

References

2005 video games
Arcade video games
Arcade-only video games
Crossover racing games
Arcade GP
Mario racing games
Namco games
Namco arcade games
Nintendo franchises
Pac-Man
Video games about size change
Video games developed in Japan

de:Mario Kart#Mario Kart Arcade GP (Spielautomat)